Anna Gertrude Hall (1882–1967) was a well known children and young adult author. Honored with a Newbery Medal honor in 1941 for her novel, Nansen.

Anna Gertrude Hall was born in West Bloomfield, New York to Myron Edwin and Anna (Sterling) Hall. She received an A.B in 1906 from Leland Stanford Junior University. She also earned a B.L.S in 1916 from New York State Library School. Hall worked at Stanford University as a librarian and cataloger between the years of 1906 and 1962. 

In 1938 she published The Library Trustee with the American Library Association which was a handbook for helping library trustees understand their roles and responsibilities which was reviewed as being "indispensable" and "a practical reference book."

Works 
The Truth about Camilla (1913)
Toward the North Pole (1964)
Cyrus Holt and the Civil War (1964)
The Cyrus Holt (1964)
Nansen (1941)

Awards
 Newbery Medal, 1941

References

1882 births
1967 deaths
American children's writers
American women children's writers
People from West Bloomfield, New York
American librarians
American women librarians
Newbery Honor winners